The following are the national records in Olympic weightlifting in Nepal. Records are maintained in each weight class for the snatch lift, clean and jerk lift, and the total for both lifts by the Nepal Weight Lifting Association.

Current records

Men

Women

Historical records

Men (1998–2018)

Women (1998–2018)

References

Nepal
records
Olympic weightlifting
weightlifting